This is the list of communities in Quebec that have the legal status of village municipalities (village, code=VL) as defined by the Ministry of Municipal Affairs, Regions and Land Occupancy.

This does not include Cree villages (code=VC), Naskapi villages (code=VK), or Northern villages (Inuit, code=VN), which have a separate legal status.

List

See also 
Administrative divisions of Quebec
Municipal history of Quebec

External links 
 MAMROT Répertoire des municipalités

Village
 
Village municipalities